Dosa plaza is a chain of fast food restaurants specializing in South Indian cuisine dosa. It was founded by Prem Ganapathy in 1997. Dosa plaza operates 72 outlets in India, New Zealand, Oman  UAE and Australia.

References

Restaurant chains in India
Fast-food franchises
Restaurants established in 1997
[[Category:Restaurants in India]